Saddam Kietyongyuth (born March 3, 1983) is a professional boxer and former Muay Thai fighter from Thailand.
He is a former WBC Asian Boxing Council Champion.

Boxing career
His first fight was againest Munukifi Suivu at the Payao Province, Thailand 2004-05-18. He was the WBC Asian Boxing Council lightweight champion.

References

Living people
1983 births
Saddam Kietyongyuth
Lightweight boxers
Saddam Kietyongyuth